Ragmala, alternatively spelt as Raagmala or Ragamala (Punjabi: ਰਾਗਮਾਲਾ ; pronounced rāgmālā), is a composition of twelve verses, running into sixty lines that names various ragas, which appears in most saroops of Sri Guru Granth Sahib Ji after the compositions of Sri Guru Arjan Dev Ji entitled Mundaavani (ਮੁੰਦਾਵਣੀ; meaning "The Royal Seal").

The title literally means a 'garland of Ragas, or musical melodies'.  "Mala" means "garland", while "Raga" is a "musical composition or mode", which has also given rise to the series of Ragamala paintings. This list differs according to the author and the music school it is based upon. Thus there exists a number of such lists in the music text books of India.

Dividing issue on Ragmala
There are eight raags that are utilised in Sri Guru Granth Sahib Ji that have not been mentioned in the Raagmala. These are: Bihagara, Wadahans, Manjh, Jaitsri, Ramkali, Tukhari, Prabhati and Jaijawanti. Mali-Gaura is not included in Raagmala but Gaura is.

“The last pages of the Kartarpur Beerh do not suggest, either because of the presence of blank spaces, or scoring out, or obliteration hortal, or otherwise, that there was or could have been the least intention to write these hymns in the Granth. The Mudaavni is on page 973/1. Pages 973/2 and 974/1 are blank, and on page 974/2 is Raagmala. As such, there could never have been the possibility, nor could it ever have been contemplated that these three writings requiring a space of over four pages could have been accommodated on the two blank pages 973/2 and 974/1.” 

According to Dr. S. S. Kapoor, the Sikh scholars differ in their opinion about its inclusion in the Granth. The traditional school thinks it to be a part of Sri Granth Sahib Ji and asserts that it is an index of the raags used in Sri Granth Sahib Ji. This argument can be challenged on the grounds that a number of raags mentioned Raagmala are not in Sri Granth Sahib Ji and a number of raags used in Sri Granth Sahib Ji are not in the Raagmala. Another argument of the traditional schools that it is a part of the original copy and is written in the same ink and with the same pen as was used for the other parts of the Granth.

Official Sikh standpoint on Ragmala
Article XI (a) of the Sikh Rehat Maryada (SRM):
"The reading of the whole Guru Granth Sahib (intermittent or non-stop) may be concluded with the reading of Mundawani alone or the Rag Mala according to the convention traditionally observed at  all the concerned places. (Since there is a difference of opinion within the Panth on this issue, nobody should dare to write or print a copy of Sri Guru Granth Sahib Ji excluding the Raag Mala)."

Gallery

See also
 Ragamala paintings
 Sikh Raags

References

Further reading 
 Śabadārath Srī Gurū Granth Sāhib. Amritsar, 1964
 Shamsher Singh Ashok. Rāgmālā Nirṇai. Amritsar, n.d.
 Surindar Siṅgh Kohli. A Critical Study of Adi Granth. Delhi, 1961
 Max Arthur Macauliffe. The Sikh Religion: Its Gurus, Sacred Writings and Authors. Oxford, 1909
 Professor Sahib Singh. About the Compilation of Sri Guru Granth Sahib (Tr. Daljit Singh). Amritsar, 1996
 Madan Singh. Raag Maala - A Re-appraisal in the Context of Sri Guru Granth Sahib Ji. Amritsar, 2003.
 Taran Singh. Ragmala. The Encyclopaedia of Sikhism, Vol. III. Ed. Harbans Singh. Punjabi University, Patiala, 1997. P 426.
 Kavi Santokh Singh. Sri Gur Partap Suraj Granth. https://web.archive.org/web/20080905180746/http://www.ik13.com/Rasses/SGPS%20Raas%203.pdf

External links 
 Raag Mala in Punjabi, Hindi and English
 Sikh Rehat Maryada

Sikh terminology

Indian classical music
Indian religious texts
Indian music history
Musical terminology